The Bollweevils is a punk band from Chicago.

The members consist of Daryl Wilson on vocals, Sensitive Pete on bass, Ken Fitzner ("Ken Weevil") on guitar, and Pete Mumford on drums.
Former members include founding bass player, Bob Skwerski, Brian Czarnik (who played simultaneously in Oblivion) on drums later replaced by Brett Friesen (who played simultaneously in Houseboy).

They formed during the Naked Raygun era which was where the band members met and also, for whom they eventually opened.

The group released a number of albums on Dr. Strange Records; though, their first, minor releases were on Underdog Records(Chicago). The group's current record label, Go Deaf Records LLC, is owned and operated by the band.

In the summer of 1993, the band went on a cross-country road tour with the Smoking Popes and 88 Fingers Louie.

Ultimately, the Bollweevils dissipated when Daryl completed medical school and became a doctor. Ken started a new band, The Feds. The Bollweevils reunited for one show in late 2003 for WLUW, the college radio station at Loyola University Chicago, and then again on November 3 and played a show at Double Door and November 5, 2006, for Riot Fest at the Congress Theater, which Naked Raygun headlined. The group says it will play another show if they can get 1000 friends on their MySpace account. In 2007, the group posted on their official website: "The Bollweevils reunion at Riot Fest 2006 wasn't a one-off deal and we're all super stoked to say that we’re a band again".

In 2011, The Bollweevils amicably parted ways with founding bassist, Bob Skwerski, and recruited  bass player, Miguel Perez.
The band was performing actively and working on new music as of 2012.

Discography

Albums
Stick Your Neck Out! (released 1994 on Dr. Strange Records)
History of the Bollweevils, Part I (released 1995 on Dr. Strange Records) - compilation of pre-Stick Your Neck Out releases
Heavyweight (released 1995 on Dr. Strange Records)
Weevillive (released 1996 on Dr. Strange Records) - live album
History of the Bollweevils, Part II (released 1999 on Dr. Strange Records) - compilation of post-Stick Your Neck Out releases

Minor releases
"A Very Punk Christmas" (Various Artists, 2×7″ released 1993 on Rocco Records/Further Beyond Records)
"Viva Chicago" (Bollweevils / 88 Fingers Louie split 7-inch covering classic Chicago punk, released 1994 on Rocco Records)
A Deadly Duo (Bollweevils/The Freeze split, released 1996 on Dr. Strange Records)
"Carol EP" (Bollweevils/4-Squares split) released 1997 Dr. Strange Records Quincy Shanks Records: 4-Squares Releases
Plan 7-inch From Outer Space! (Bollweevils/Sleepasaurus split, released 1997 on Motherbox Records)
Doc Hopper/ Bollweevils split (released 1997)

References
[ Allmusic]

External links
Official site
Dr. Strange Records

Musical groups from Chicago
Punk rock groups from Illinois